JustJin (stylized as #JustJin) is the second studio album by Japanese singer-songwriter Jin Akanishi, released on November 6, 2013, by Warner Music Group.

Background
This is Akanishi's second full studio album after Japonicana, released on March 6, 2012 both physically and digitally in America. Besides the singles released in 2013, "Hey What's Up?" and "Ai Naru Hō e", it also includes two singles previously released in 2011, "Eternal" and "Seasons".

Release
The album was released in two different editions, standard and limited. The limited edition A comes with an additional CD with eight new English-language songs written between 2012 and 2013, while edition B includes music videos from the four singles featured in the album. The songs on Disc 1 are mostly in Japanese, while those on Disc 2 are mostly in English.

Touring
From November 14 to December 19 the "Club Circuit" concert tour was held, with 12 concerts in 5 cities in Japan. It also included songs from the Japonicana album, as its promotional tour wasn't held in Japan.

Chart performance
The album debuted on the Oricon's daily album charts at number one, selling 23,036 copies. It stayed at number three on the weekly charts, selling 38,542 copies in its first week of release, and charted for seven weeks. On Billboard's Japan Top Albums chart it peaked at number four.

Track listing

Charts

References

2013 albums
Jin Akanishi albums